Yadav Kant Silwal (Nepali: यादव कान्त सिलवाल) is a Nepalese diplomat and former Foreign Secretary, who also served as the Secretary General of the South Asian Association for Regional Cooperation from January 1, 1994 to December 31, 1995. A 1960 batch member of Nepalese Foreign Service, he has served as Nepal's Ambassador to Russia before becoming Foreign Secretary in 1993. His earlier assignments were in Rome, Beijing and New York.

References

 "Nepal Maoists refuse to allow Koirala to attend SAARC summit". India Today, 29 July 2009.

External links
 SAARC Secretary General's Homepage 
 Archive copy
 SAARC Homepage

Living people
Secretaries General of the South Asian Association for Regional Cooperation
Ambassadors of Nepal to Russia
Year of birth missing (living people)